Paul Pierre Lévy (15 September 1886 – 15 December 1971) was a  French mathematician who was active especially in probability theory, introducing fundamental concepts  such as local time, stable distributions and characteristic functions.   Lévy processes, Lévy flights, Lévy measures, Lévy's constant, the Lévy distribution, the Lévy area, the Lévy arcsine law, and the fractal Lévy C curve are  named after him.

Biography 

Lévy was born in Paris to a Jewish family which already included several mathematicians. His father Lucien Lévy was an examiner at the École Polytechnique. Lévy  attended the École Polytechnique and published his first paper in 1905, at the age of nineteen, while still an undergraduate, in which he introduced the Lévy–Steinitz theorem.  His teacher and advisor was Jacques Hadamard.  After graduation, he spent a year in military service and then studied for three years at the École des Mines, where he became a professor in 1913.

During World War I Lévy conducted mathematical analysis work for the French Artillery. In 1920 he was appointed Professor of Analysis at the École Polytechnique, where his students included Benoît Mandelbrot and Georges Matheron. He remained at the École Polytechnique until his retirement in 1959, with a gap during World War II after his 1940 firing because of the Vichy anti-Jewish legislation.

Lévy made many fundamental contributions to probability theory and the nascent theory of stochastic processes. 
He introduced the notion of 'stable distribution' which share the property of stability under addition of independent variables and proved a general version of the Central Limit theorem, recorded in his 1937 book Théorie de l'addition des variables aléatoires, using the notion of characteristic function. He also introduced, independently from Ya. Khinchine, the notion of infinitely divisible law and derived their characterization through the Lévy–Khintchine representation.

His 1948 monograph on Brownian motion, Processus stochastiques et mouvement brownien, contains a wealth of new concepts and results, including the Lévy area, the Lévy arcsine law,
the  local time of a Brownian path, and many other results.

Lévy received a number of honours, including membership at the French Academy of Sciences and honorary membership at the London Mathematical Society.

His daughter Marie-Hélène Schwartz and son-in-law Laurent Schwartz were also notable mathematicians.

Works 

 1922 – Lecons d'analyse Fonctionnelle
 1925 – Calcul des probabilités
 1937 – Théorie de l'addition des variables aléatoires
 1948 – Processus stochastiques et mouvement brownien
 1954 – Le mouvement brownien

See also
 Cramér's decomposition theorem
 Lévy distribution
 Lévy metric
 Lévy's modulus of continuity
 Lévy–Prokhorov metric
 Lévy's continuity theorem
 Lévy's zero-one law
 Concentration of measure
 Lévy process
 Lévy–Khintchine representation
 Lévy–Itô decomposition
 Lévy flight
 local time
 Isoperimetric inequality on a sphere
 Lévy's characterisation of Brownian motion

References

External links
 Rama Cont:   Paul Lévy: a biography
 Gérard P. Michon:   Paul Lévy and Functional Analysis
 
 

 
Jewish French scientists
École Polytechnique alumni
Mines Paris - PSL alumni
Corps des mines
1886 births
1971 deaths
20th-century French mathematicians
19th-century French Jews
Probability theorists
Members of the French Academy of Sciences